James Parker (February 20, 1854 – June 2, 1934) was a major general in the United States Army and a Medal of Honor recipient for his role in the Philippine–American War during 1899. His son, Cortlandt Parker, also became a major general in the United States Army.

Early life and education
Parker was born in Newark, New Jersey on February 20, 1854, a son of Cortlandt Parker (1818-1907) and Elizabeth (Stites) Parker.  He was a member of a family long active in New Jersey government and politics.  His father was a prominent attorney who served as public prosecutor of Essex County.  His grandfather, James Parker (1776-1868) was a member of Congress.  His older brother, Richard W. Parker also served in the United States House of Representatives.  A younger brother, Charles W. Parker served as a justice of the Supreme Court of New Jersey.  Parker's nephew Henry Parkman Jr. was the son of Parker's sister Mary.

James Parker was educated at Newark Academy, Phillips Academy (Andover, Massachusetts) and Rutgers College, where he was admitted to the Zeta Psi fraternity.  He graduated from the United States Military Academy at West Point, New York in 1876, 31st in a class of 50 cadets, and was appointed second lieutenant.<ref>Parker, James. [https://books.google.com/books?id=xjO6_WptGLIC&pg=PR7&dq=%22james+parker%22+%22newark+academy%22 The Old Army: Memories 1872–1918"], p. vii., Stackpole Books, 2003. . Accessed July 21, 2011. "In 1864, James Parker began his schooling at Englewood Academy, Perth Amboy, New Jersey.... Parker, an intelligent individual, was well-educated, attending the Newark Academy; the well-regarded Phillips Academy of Andover, Massachusetts; and the United States Military Academy at West Point, New York."</ref>

Military career
He spent his early years serving in the Fourth United States Cavalry participating in the Indian Wars of the Southwest. His military career was influenced by the magnetic personality of the commander of the Fourth Cavalry, General Ranald S. Mackenzie, a legend for his success as a cavalry commander in the American Civil War. In May 1886, First Lieutenant Parker commanded one column of troops sent into Mexico to track down the famous Apache leader Geronimo and his band, and cooperated with Captain Henry W. Lawton and First Lieutenant Charles B. Gatewood when Geronimo was captured.

Later, he served as second in command of the 12th New York Infantry in Cuba during the Spanish–American War and saw significant combat while commanding the 45th Volunteer Infantry in the Philippine–American War during 1899 where he earned the Medal of Honor. From 1903 to 1904, he also served as Head of Militia Affairs in the Adjutant General's office.

During the First World War, General Parker served as Commander of the Southern Department, Fort Sam Houston, Texas from 31 March 1917 to 25 August 1917; as division commander of the 32nd Division from 25 August to 11 December 1917; and as division commander of the 85th Division from 11 December 1917 to 20 February 1918, when, having reached the statutory age of 64, he was retired from active service.

Retirement and death 
He retired on February 20, 1934 and moved to Newport, Rhode Island where he died on June 2, 1934.  He is buried in a family plot at St. Mary's Episcopal Churchyard in Portsmouth, Rhode Island.

His papers are held by the United States Military Academy.

Military awards
In addition to the Medal of Honor, Major General Parker was awarded the Distinguished Service Medal and three Silver Stars for his service and battlefield exploits.

Full list of decorations and medals:

 Medal of Honor
 Distinguished Service Medal
 Silver Star with two oak leaf clusters (retroactive award in 1932)
 Indian Campaign Medal
 Spanish War Service Medal
 Philippine Campaign Medal
 World War I Victory Medal

Medal of Honor citation
Citation:

While in command of a small garrison repulsed a savage night attack by overwhelming numbers of the enemy, fighting at close quarters in the dark for several hours.

Publications 
Parker, James. The Mounted Rifleman; A Method of Garrison Training and Field Instruction of Cavalry, Including Tests and Combat Exercises, As Used in the First Cavalry Brigade, U.S. Army. Menasha, Wis: George Banta Pub. Co, 1916. 
Parker, James. The Old Army; Memories, 1872-1918''. Philadelphia: Dorrance & Co, 1929.

See also

 List of Medal of Honor recipients

Notes

References
 
 

United States Army Medal of Honor recipients
Newark Academy alumni
Phillips Academy alumni
Recipients of the Silver Star
Rutgers University alumni
United States Army generals of World War I
United States Military Academy alumni
Military personnel from Newark, New Jersey
1854 births
1934 deaths
Recipients of the Distinguished Service Medal (US Army)
American military personnel of the Philippine–American War
Philippine–American War recipients of the Medal of Honor
American military personnel of the Indian Wars
United States Army generals